Nanjing University (NJU) is a national public research university in Nanjing, Jiangsu. It is a member of C9 League and a Class A Double First Class University designated by the Chinese central government. NJU has two main campuses: the Xianlin campus in the northeast of Nanjing, and the Gulou campus in the city center of Nanjing.

Established in 1902 as Sanjiang Normal School, Nanjing University underwent a number of name changes, such as Nanjing Higher Normal School, National Southeastern University and National Central University, until it was renamed Nanjing University in 1950. It merged with the University of Nanking in 1952. NJU is perennially ranked one of the best research universities in China, and one of the most selective universities in the nation. 

As of 2022, Nanjing University ranked 7th in China and 95th globally by Times Higher Education World University Rankings. Regarding scientific research output, the Nature Index Annual Table 2022 ranked Nanjing University the No.5 university in China and the Asia Pacific region, and 8th in the world among global universities.

History

Late Qing and Republic of China 

In 1902, Sanjiang Normal College under the new educational system, using Japanese modern higher institutions of learning as references, was beginning to be established to replace the traditional Chinese school Nanking Academy, and was opened in the next year, with campus constructed south to Qintian Mountain. The name was changed to Liangjiang Normal College in 1906, and the new president Li Ruiqing established the first faculty of modern art in China.

In 1915 after the Republic of China replaced Qing dynasty, the Nanking Higher Normal School was founded to replace Liangjiang Higher Normal School which was closed three years before due to Xinhai Revolution, Jiang Qian was appointed as the president. The school established the China's first faculty of modern gymnastics (physical education) in 1916. In 1920 the school consisted of five colleges: Liberal Arts, Agriculture, Engineering, Commerce and Education.

The "China Science Society", a major science organization in the modern history of China, founded its headquarter in the school in 1918. Its members established "Academia Sinica" which was later moved to Taiwan and known as the "Chinese Academy of Sciences" in mainland China. Numerous Chinese modern science pioneers, most of whom studied in America and some European countries such as Britain, France, and Germany, converged there to found many fields of science in China. It became the Chinese cradle of modern science. Among 81 academicians of "Academia Sinica" elected for the first time in 1948, five entered or graduated from the university in 1920. More than half of the leading Chinese scientists whose works were published in scientific journals in the early period of Chinese modern science were graduates or academics of Nanjing University.

Kuo Ping-wen (Guo Bingwen), an influential university president, was appointed in 1919 after Jiang Qian. The school meeting passed The Audit Law for Women Students on December 7, 1919, as result of efforts of the educationist T'ao Hsing-chih (Tao Xingzhi), as well as the president Guo Bingwen, and the professors including Liu Boming, Luh Chih-wei (Lu Zhiwei), Yang Hsingfo (Yang Xingfo), etc., and then decided to formally recruit female students. The school became the first higher learning institution in China to recruit coeducational students. It enrolled eight women students in the first year 1920, and in addition, more than 50 female auditing students were admitted.

In 1921 the National Southeastern University was founded, and in 1923 Nanking Higher Normal School was merged into it. In the autumn of 1921, the Faculty of Business established in 1917 was moved to Shanghai to establish the first business school conferring degrees in China. The university consisted of five colleges (or schools) at the time: Liberal Arts (including departments of Chinese literature, foreign literature, history, philosophy, psychology, mathematics, physics, chemistry, biology, geoscience, and the Department of Politics, Law and Economics), Education, Agriculture, Engineering, and Commerce (or Business, including departments of general commerce, business administration, accounting, finance, economics, international trade, etc.), and soon later the College of Liberal Arts was divided to be College of Humanities and College of Sciences. The earliest modern scientific research laboratories and groups in China were established at the university. It integrated teaching and research, with status of university's independence and academic freedom, and was regarded as the earliest Chinese modern university. The university along with its affiliated primary school and middle school served as a pioneer and model which laid the foundations for the establishment of modern educational system (Renhsü Hsüehchih, 1922) in China, and in addition, its experimental kindergarten (Gulou Kindergarten) founded in 1923 was later also adopted as the model for Chinese kindergartens (Kindergarten Courses Standards by Ministration of Education, 1932), including its teaching system, teaching materials, teaching methods and teaching tools. In October 1921, "Hsuehheng Society" (or Xueheng Society) was founded in the university which was the focus of the "Hsuehheng School" included the scholars Liu Yizheng, Liu Boming (劉伯明), Mei Guangdi, Wu Mi and Hu Hsien-Hsu (Hu Xiansu). They reinvigorated Confucian culture and humanism and published the monthly "Critical Review" (Xueheng,  in Chinese) in January 1922. It enabled Nanjing University to become a center of Confucian thought and humanistic scholarship. During this period, Nanjing University was known as the foremost "Oriental Education Centre" and recognized as an academic and cultural exchange centre for east and west. Many scholars visited and instructed there, including the American educationist Paul Monroe, W. H. Kilpatrick, E. L. Thorndike, philosopher John Dewey, British philosopher Bertrand Russell, German philosopher Hans Driesch and the Indian (also Bengali) poet Rabindranath Tagore.

The university became the capital national university after Nanking was made the capital by Nationalist Government, initially renamed National Dyisyi Chungshan University (or called National Nanking Chungshan University) in June 1927 when National Southeastern University merged eight public schools in Jiangsu province, and was renamed Jiangsu University in February 1928, and in May 1928, it was renamed National Central University. At the time there were eight colleges (or schools): Humanity, Social Science, Natural Science, Engineering, Education, Commerce, Agriculture, and Medicine. The College of Commerce moved to Shanghai in 1921 and College of Medicine established in Shanghai in 1927 were split from the university in 1932. In 1935 College of Medicine was again established, in Nanjing. During the Anti-Japanese War between 1937 and 1945, the university moved to Chongqing, while the College of Medicine and Department of Animal Husbandry & Veterinary Medicine of College of Agriculture moved to Chengdu. The Chinese Association of Natural Science was originated at the university in 1927 and adopted the name next year, which was the second largest scientific organization in China in 1949, after China Science Society. China Association of Scientific Workers was founded in the university in 1944. China Science Society and the associations were merged to be the China Association for Science and Technology in 1958 in Beijing. The Natural Science Forum was initiated by the university faculties in 1939, which was later renamed Jiusan Forum (Sept. 3rd Forum) and became Jiusan Society in 1945, an organization for intellectual groups in China.  In the united college entrance examinations beginning in 1937, about two-thirds of students put the university as the first choice. It became the first Chinese university to enroll a blind student, enrolling Luo Fuxin in 1942.

People's Republic of China 
In 1949, during the late time of Chinese Civil War, the central government of the Republic of China retreated from Nanking and the National Central University was renamed National Nanking University (National Nanjing University) after Nanking was controlled by CPC army, before the establishment of People's Republic of China. In 1952, many colleges and departments, mainly colleges of education (or teacher, normal, including art and physical education departments), engineering, agriculture, and medicine, were split from Nanjing University, and many new independent schools were formed, including Nanjing Normal University, Nanjing Institute of Technology which was located at former Nanjing University site and later renamed Southeast University, etc. At the same time, University of Nanking, a private university established in 1888 and sponsored by American churches, was merged into Nanjing University, which lost its "national" appellation in 1950 to reflect the reality that all universities in the PRC would be public, and Nanjing University moved campus to the site of University of Nanking where was west to Gulou Mountain and was also once the site of imperial Nanjing University in ancient times. A separate National Central University was reinstated in Taiwan by its old alumni association in 1962.

During the period of communist society including the period of Proletarian Cultural Revolution, the school suffered heavily. In 1976, Nanjing University faculty members and students launched Anti Cultural Revolution Force Movement which was called "Nanjing Incident" by the authorities of the time, spreading countrywide. In 1978, Hu Fuming, a faculty member of Nanjing University in philosophy, wrote the historic article entitled "Practice is the Sole Criterion for Testing Truth", and after being published it led to the nationwide "Debate on Standards for Judging the Truth", and thus in certain degree liberated thought and promoted the ending of Cultural Revolution and the coming of reform era.

After the Reform and new development 
Many faculties have been reestablished or newly founded since the Reform after 1978, e.g., law reestablished in 1981, medical school in 1987, environmental department newly founded in 1984. Some departments were divided into two or more departments, e.g., the Chinese language and literature department divided into departments of language & linguistics, literature, philology and drama arts, or some new faculties came out of older faculties, e.g., computer came out of mathematics, urban planning came out of geography, in many case formed integratively, i.e., formed based on parts of two or more faculties, e.g., parts of faculties of physics and chemistry integratively formed material faculty. In around 1990 the university consisted of schools (colleges) of Humanities, Sciences, Technological Sciences, Medicine, Business, etc.. Then many departments became schools, e.g., mathematics, physics, chemistry, or grouped into new schools, e.g., architecture and urban planning. The size of university significantly expanded during the years.

In 2009, Xianlin Campus opened to undergraduates, replacing Pukou Campus which was in use since 1993, and Pukou Campus became the campus of NJU Jinling College, an independent private college directed by NJU. The Xianlin campus now is a main campus along with Gulou campus.

Faculties 

More than 1500 years ago, ancient University of Nanjing founded the earliest faculties of literature, history, etc.. In modern times, Nanjing University established Chinese first faculties of art, gymnastics, biology, psychology, business management, etc.. Its faculties, departments and schools have been changed and evolved timely. For example, in 1921, the university consisted of 5 schools: liberal arts, education, agriculture, engineering and business, in 1928 the school of liberal arts had become three schools, and the university consisted of 8 schools: humanities, social sciences, natural sciences, education, agriculture, engineering, business and medicine, and now, many former departments of humanities, natural sciences and social sciences have become schools.

The system of academic degree or diploma has also been changed. In the early years of ROC the university adopted the system similar to western especially American universities and began to award bachelor's degree. The university founded China's first modern laboratories in physics, chemistry, etc.. In 1922, the university professors founded The Biology Research Institute of Science Society of China, the first modern scientific research institute in China, integrated with the university's biology department. With the aid of Rockefeller Foundation, Science Centre was constructed in 1924 and completed three years later. In 1926 the university passed The General Regulation of Graduate Institute. China's first doctor's degree was awarded by the school of medicine of the university in 1931. Soon the educational system was changed. In the early 1980s after a period of transformation, universities in mainland China resumed to award doctor's degrees, and graduate and undergraduate education were integrated into departments and schools. Nanjing University is the first in mainland China to award doctor's degrees in such fields as Chinese studies, world history, computer science.

It is distinguished in many fields including Chinese Language and Literature, and natural sciences.
Its faculty, including part-time faculty, includes more than twenty Nobel Laureates engaged in teaching.
The university is a Double First Class University Plan university in 15 academic disciplines.

Schools and departments 

Current schools and departments
 School of Liberal Arts (School of Literature, or College of Literature)
 Chinese Language and Linguistics; Literature; Philology; Drama Arts
 School of History
 Chinese History; World History; Archaeology
 Department of Philosophy; Religion
 School of Foreign Studies
 English; Russian; Japanese; French; German; Spanish; Korean; International Business
 School of Government
 Politics; Government Administration; Labor, Personnel and Social Security; Diplomacy and International Affairs 
 School of Law
 School of Social and Behavioral Sciences
 Sociology; Social Work and Social Policy; Psychology; Anthropology (institute)
 School of Business (NUBS)
 School of Management: Business Administration; Human Resource; Accounting; Marketing & Electronic Commerce
 School of Economics: Economics; Industrial Economics; International Economics & Trading; Finance
 Department of Information Management
 School of Journalism and Communication
 Department of Mathematics
 School of Physics
 Physics; Modern Physics; Photoelectricity Science; Acoustic Science and Engineering
 School of Astronomy and Space Science
 Astronomy; Space Science
 School of Chemistry and Chemical Engineering
 Chemistry; Chemical Engineering; Polymer
 School of Geoscience
 School of Atmosphere Science: Meteorology; Atmosphere Physics
 School of Earth Science and Engineering: Earth Science; Water Science; Geology Engineering and Information Technology
 School of Geography and Ocean Science: Natural Geography; Land, Resources and Tourism;  Earth Information Science; Coast and Ocean Science
 School of Life Sciences
 Biology; Biochemistry
 School of Medicine
 Clinical Medicine; Dentistry; Basic Medical Science; Laboratory Medicine; Public Health and Medicine (institute)
 School of Environment
 School of Architecture and Planning
Architecture; Urban Planning and Design
 School of Electronics Science and Engineering
 Electronic Engineering; Micro-electronics and Optoelectronics; Informational Electronics; Communication Engineering
 Department of Computer Science and Technology; Software Institute
 College of Engineering and Applied Sciences
 Materials; Energy; Quantum Electronics and Optical Engineering; Biomedical Engineering

 Institute of Education (Graduate School of Education) 
 Institute for Gymnastics
 Institute of Arts
 Institute for Advanced Studies in the Humanities and Social Science
 School for Basic Sciences Education
 International School
 School for Overseas Students Education
 Jinling College(First-class applied college)
 Johns Hopkins University-Nanjing University Center for Chinese and American Studies (Hopkins-Nanjing Center)
 Other research and education institutes in areas such as African Studies, Judaic Studies, Agriculture, Engineering Management, etc.

Campus 

Nanjing University has four main campuses: Gulou, Xianlin, Pukou, and Suzhou campus. The distance between Gulou and Xianlin campus is about 18 kilometers.

Gulou Campus is located in Gulou District, at the center of Nanjing City. The main campus itself is divided into two sections by Hankou Road: North Garden, Bei Yuan, is where teaching and research take place; and South Garden, Nan Yuan, serves as the living area for both students and academic staff.

Pukou Campus is situated in the suburban Pukou District, by the northern side of Nanjing New & High-Tech Industry Development Zone, and became part of Nanjing University in 1993. Once Pukou campus hosted undergraduate freshmen, sophomore and junior students. In 2009, the Pukou campus became the campus hosted the undergraduate students in Nanjing University Jinling College, which was founded by Nanjing University in 1998. Nanjing University Biomedical Research Institute is also located in Pukou.

Xianlin Campus is located in the northeast of Nanjing, in the Xianlin Universities Town, south of Yangtse River and Qixia Mountain, east of Purple Mountain, and west of Baohua Mountain. The campus is home to undergraduate students and parts of graduate students. It was opened in September 2009. There is the stop of Nanjing University Xianlin Campus on Line 2 of Nanjing Subway, which enables Xianlin and Gulou campus to be connected through subway.

In Gulou campus, there are several museums including Nanjing University Museum, Museum of Art and Archaeology, Museum of Earth Science. There is Sun Yat-sen House. It's said that Sun Yat-sen, the first president (provisional president) of the Republic of China, lived there. There are also Pearl Buck House, John Rabe House, etc.. Gulou campus is now becoming mainly for professional graduate campus.

The location of Nanjing University has changed for several times, with historical campuses mainly in Fuzimiao (on the bank of Qinhuai River), Gulou, Chaotiangong and Sipailou (south of Qintian Mountain) areas. In addition, during Anti-Japanese War, its main campus moved to Shapingba, Chungking, with two auxiliary campuses, one in Bohsi, Chungking, and one in Hwahsiba, Chengdu, in some sense combined with Chongqing University and Western China University (now medical school of Sichuan University) respectively. It also deserves to mention that before the war, with the rapid development of the university, a new campus planned to cover an area of 8000 mu (about ) south to Niushou Mountain in the southern suburb area of Nanjing had been built for near a year. After the war, it moved back to Nanjing, making former campus Sipailou as main campus, and the new campus Dingjiaqiao was built for agriculture and medical schools. Nanjing University relocated in Gulou six years after moving back, and then near sixty years later Xianlin campus emerged. Today's Nanjing University Gulou campus is the location of Imperial University of Nanjing during Former Song dynasty in more than 1500 years ago when it was in the west of the city, and now it's in the centre of the city.

Culture

Motto 
Officially translated into English as "Sincerity with Aspiration, Perseverance and Integrity". Another version is "Be Honest and Intelligent, Study Hard and Act Sincerely."()

The first half of this motto was the motto during the National Central University time, and the last half was quoted from the classic literature work Book of Rites. It was voted to be the motto by university students in 2002, and the then university president supported it and wrote an article to interpret it.

The translation does not fully express the meaning of the Chinese words of the motto. Motto counterparts between Chinese and English literally: Cheng (诚, Sincerity, Honesty, Integrity), Pu (樸, Simplicity, Austerity, naturally being oneself), Xiong (雄, Sturdiness, Majesty, being vigorous and keeping ideal and ambition, being firm and persistent with fortitude), Wei (偉, Greatness, having great ideal and ambition, with great mind comprehending, containing and improving world), Li Xue (勵學, Endeavor to Learn), Dun Xing (敦行, Urge to Act, Act Sincerely). The term Dun Xing comes from the context in Book of Rites: Having broad knowledge and strong learning ability and being modest, acting in sincerity and benignity and not slack, that is a gentleman (gentleperson) (博聞強識而讓 敦善行而不怠 謂之君子).

Song 
The university song, recovered in 2002, was created in 1916. It is the first school song in the modern history of Nanjing University, with the lyrics written by Jiang Qian and melody composed by Li Shutong.

Anniversary 
The present school anniversary is on May 20 every year, which was set by the school authority in 1954 in some sense due to some ideological reasons of the time, with the starting year being 1902 when relaunching the school as a modern higher learning institution, and the day May 20 in memory of the movement of anti-hunger and anti-war initiated by the university in that day of 1947. In recent years, the date May 20 has another new meaning: in Chinese Nanjing pronunciation, 5.20, sounds like I Love You (Wu Ai Ni). It shows students' love for their Alma Mater.

Rankings and reputation

Global rankings 
As of 2022, Nanjing University ranked 7th in China and 95th globally by Times Higher Education World University Rankings. Nanjing University consistently features in the top 150 international universities as ranked by the Academic Ranking of World Universities, the QS World University Rankings, the Times Higher Education World University Rankings, and the U.S. News & World Report. Regarding scientific research output, the Nature Index Annual Table 2022 ranked Nanjing University the 5th university in China and the Asia Pacific region, and 8th in the world among global universities. 

Nanjing University is consistently ranked among the top universities in Asia according to several major international university rankings. The joint THE-QS World University Rankings 2007 ranked Nanjing University 4th in China after (Peking, Tsinghua and Fudan), 17th in Asia and 125th in the world. The Times Higher Education World University Rankings 2011 placed Nanjing 120th in the world, 16th in Asia and 4th in China. In 2017, Nanjing University was ranked 91-100 for World Reputation Ranking by Times Higher Education, and 114 by QS World University Rankings. In 2017, its Graduate Employability rankings placed at #101 globally in the QS Graduate Employability Rankings. Nanjing has been consistently ranked among the top 20 universities in the world by Nature Index since 2016 by Nature Portfolio.

Domestic rankings 
Nanjing University is generally considered one of the most competitive university in China. The first-time integrative ranking of universities in China, in 1989, ranked Nanjing as the No.1 comprehensive university. Reviewing rankings, domestically, according to university rankings in China, Nanjing University was generally ranked among the top 3 universities before the university merger tide occurred in the several years about after 2000, and then ranking down, even falling to No.7. Chinese university ranking by Chinese Academy of Management Science since 1995 ranked Nanjing University between 1st and 3rd before 2000 and since then between 3rd and 6th. Chinese university ranking since 1999 by the higher education publisher Netbig consistently ranked the university among the top 3 before 2005, and in the most recent ranking among the top 5. Academic Ranking of World Universities since 2003 by Shanghai Jiaotong University suggested a domestic rank of number 2 to number 7.

Admissions

Selectivity 
Known for its stringent admission criteria, Nanjing University was reported in 2021 by one source to be the fourth most selective university ("the university that is the hardest to get in") in mainland China.

Overseas students 
In 2012, 667 new students from abroad attended Nanking University, among them about 20% from USA, 22% from Britain, France, Germany and Italy and the rest from other countries. In 2013 Nanda recruited 761 overseas students from 61 countries. In 2014, there were about 3600 overseas students, about 40% from Asia, 40% from Europe and North America, and 20% from other regions.

Academics

Chinese language and literature 
Nanjing University has a long history in the field of Chinese language and literature. The School of Literature founded by Hsieh Yuan in the 15th year of Yuanjia reign (CE 438) was the oldest literature school in ancient China. In modern times, it was the first in mainland China to have granted a doctoral degree in Chinese Language and Literature. In addition, Nanjing University is in close cooperation with the United Nations to offer a Chinese language programme. Widely recognized as one of the most eminently prestigious Schools of Chinese in the world, it was ranked with Peking University as Joint No. 1 in Chinese Language and Literature. Peking University and Nanjing University are widely recognized in the academic community as the two top universities in the field of Chinese Language and Literature in the world, with both consistently taking the two top places in rankings on the subject. [Nanjing University] had produced modern China's first PhD in Chinese Language and Literature, Dr. Mo Lifeng (莫砺锋), who is still serving as its Professor of Chinese.

Western literature 
Nanjing University established the first department of Western literature among Chinese universities, in 1921. Two years later the department was merged with English department and other faculties including French and German and renamed department of foreign languages and literature, later known as school of foreign studies. China Association for the Study of American Literature (CASAL) is located in the school.

Other university-affiliated institutions

Herbarium 
Nanjing University Herbarium (N) was founded in the 4th year of ROC, although there were herbarium specimens in the school before. It's the first modern herbarium in China. It is located in the Tianjiabing Building.

Notable alumni and people

Alumni and students 
 Among the winners of the National Science Foundation for Distinguished Young Scholars from 1994 to 2008, 108 are graduates of Nanda, ranking No. 1, 96 are of Beida, 76 are of University of Science and Technology of China, and 64 are of Tsinghua University which is listed in top 4.
 Among 78 winners of Prizes for Young Scientists of China since 1992, 5 are Nanda graduates, both Beida and Tsinghua graduates are 4, consisting of top 3 rankings.
 A statistic in 2006 indicated that among about 120 directors (or presidents) of institutes of Chinese Academy of Sciences, 15 are graduates of Nanjing University, ranking No. 1, while the number of the university (Peking University) ranking No.2 is 10, and a recent statistic in 2010 shows that 14 holds bachelor's from Nanda which is the double of the number of the university (Beida) which ranks No.2.
 Among 25 winners of National Preeminent Science and Technology Award since 2000, 4 are graduates of Nanjing University: Liu Dongsheng, Min Enze, Wu Liangyong, Zhang Cunhao, ranking top 3 along with Tsinghua University and Peking University, and besides, the winner Cheng Kaijia is a faculty member of Nanjing University, and Yuan Longping is a graduate of the then middle school affiliated to Nanjing University (now the High School Affiliated to Nanjing Normal University).
 Nanjing University ranks No.1 in the number of alumni elected as academicians of Chinese Academy of Sciences and/or Chinese Academy of Engineering graduated in recent more than 30 years since college admission entrance examination system was recovered in 1977 after Cultural Revolution.
 In the first time Examination for senior civil service post of Republic of China (as recovery of and equivalent to Imperial examination) in 1931, top 100 were selected, all were males, among them 25 are graduates of Nanjing University, including Zhuangyuan (principal graduate) Chow Bangdao, who was later president of China Medical College and Political Deputy Ministry of Examination, ROC, and the school in the second place is Peking University, with 8 graduates. In the second time exam held in 1933, there were females passed, half of whom graduated from Nanjing University, as well as Zhuangyuan Lee Hsuehteng, who graduated from law school and later became Chief Justice of ROC Supreme Court. One-fourth of Chief Justices in the early 60 more years of Republic of China are National Central University (Nanjing University) alumni.
 In sciences, there are 877 leading scientists with major contributions to modern sciences in China, as listed in an article on history of Chinese modern sciences by Li Peishan published on CAS journal, and among them 115 are graduates of Nanjing University during Republic of China in the mainland period (1912–49), ranking No.1.

University faculty and people 
 Among 30 First Class Prizes of National Natural Science Awards since 1956, which is the highest level prize in natural science in China, 6 major winners (sole or first listed winner) studied at Nanjing University: Feng Kang, Liu Dongsheng, Wang Debao, Qin Renchang, Hou Xianguang, Min Naiben; in addition, another 2 were faculty members: Li Siguang, Qian Chongshu; and Nanda people are in the list of winners of about half of the prizes. 
 In recent years after the reform since 1978, Nanjing University is in third place in the number of academicians of Chinese Academy of Sciences and/or Chinese Academy of Engineering among faculty members, behind Peking University and Tsinghua University.
 Among 1107 members of Chinese Academy of Sciences elected till 2007, 210 are Nanjing University people.
 All four founding scientific leaders (president or vice president in natural science) of Chinese Academy of Sciences once taught or studied at Nanjing University: Zhu Kezhen (faculty member), Wu Youxun (graduate), Yan Jici (graduate), Tong Dizhou (faculty member). 
 Of 53 first-time elected academicians of Academia Sinica in natural science including mathematics, 28 were graduates or once faculty members of Nanjing University.

In literature 
Nanjing University in literature, media and various related works
 Liao-Fan's Four Lessons, a book, film, drama serials. The book is written by Yuan LiaoFan, a graduate of Imperial University of Nanking in Ming dynasty. 
 Chiang Kai-Shek's Face (蔣公的面子), a story about three professors and president Chiang Kai-Shek (president of Republic of China and also president of National Central University).

See also
Guozijian
National Central University

Notes

References

External links

 Nanjing University 
 General Alumni Association of Nanjing University 
  Nanjing University Alumni Association - US
 Official English Website 

 
Ancient universities
Educational institutions established in the 3rd century
258 establishments
Educational institutions established in the 20th century
Educational institutions established in 1902
Educational institutions established in 1915
1915 establishments in China
Project 211
Project 985
Plan 111
Vice-ministerial universities in China
C9 League
Universities and colleges in Nanjing